PR Girls is a 1998 Hong Kong drama film co-written and directed by Matt Chow.

External links

1998 films
1998 drama films
Films directed by Matt Chow
Hong Kong drama films
1990s Hong Kong films